Christian Julius Toxward (1831–1891) was a New Zealand architect. He was born in Copenhagen, Denmark in 1831. He is buried at Bolton Street Memorial Park, and his grave is part of the memorial trail.

See also
 St Mary's Cathedral, Wellington
 Old St. Paul's, Wellington

References

1831 births
1891 deaths
Danish emigrants to New Zealand
Architects from Copenhagen
Burials at Bolton Street Cemetery
19th-century New Zealand architects
19th-century Danish architects